Mariusz Fyrstenberg and Marcin Matkowski were the defending champions, but lost in the second round to Juan Martín del Potro and  Mardy Fish.

Seeds
All seeds receive a bye into the second round.

Draw

Finals

Top half

Bottom half

External links
Draw

Mutua Madrilena Madrid Open - Men's Doubles
Men's Doubles